This is a list of states (and some territories) by the annual prevalence of cocaine use as percentage of the population aged 15–64 (unless otherwise indicated). published by the United Nations Office on Drugs and Crime (UNODC). The indicator is the "annual prevalence" rate which is the percentage of the youth and adult population who have consumed the drug at least once in the past year.

According to a 2019 study, 5 Swiss cities (St Gallen, Bern, Zurich, Basel and Geneva) were listed among top 10 European cities for cocaine use.

See also

List of countries by prevalence of opiates use
List of countries by prevalence of cannabis use

References

Substance dependence
Cocaine
Cocaine abuse, List of countries by prevalence of